= Canadian University of Niger =

Private university in Niamey, Niger

- Université canadienne du Niger
- Type: Private university
- Established: 2002
- Founders: Dr. Ismaël Camara
- Rector: Dr. Ismaël Camara
- Location: Niamey, Niger; 13.4976°N 2.13129°E
- Language: French

The Canadian University of Niger (UNICAN) is a private university located in Niamey, the capital of Niger.

== History ==
The Canadian University of Niger is the first private higher education institution in Niger to be legally granted university status by the country's Ministry of Higher Education. It opened its doors on November 25, 2002.

== Organization ==
UNICAN consists of three faculties:

- Faculty of Management
- Faculty of Law
- Faculty of Rural Economics
